House signs have been used since ancient times to personalise a dwelling, turning a house into a home.

Types

Stone

Stone signs are hard to beat for their durability. The most commonly used rock includes marble, granite, and slate.  Marble and Granite can look quite elegant, but do not have much scope for artwork beyond simple line drawings. Any sculptural shaping in these signs is typically very expensive. Slate has its own distinctive appearance which is also popular despite being again not suitable for carving. If gilding is desired, these signs should be hand carved for maximum visual impact. Sand-blasting, though less expensive, creates a rounded groove, with inferior reflective quality.

Cast Metal (traditional)

These signs are usually made of aluminium, iron, copper, bronze or brass in a smelting process where molten metal is poured into a mold and then allowed to cool.  The unique and prestigious look can be quite appealing but signs produced this way do come with some disadvantages: they are costly to produce; quite heavy and the manufacturing process contributes to pollution and the emission of volatile organic compounds (VOCs). Brass tends to tarnish and corrode after a few years, as does iron. Also, artwork on these signs is generally restricted to a motif chosen from a gallery or a template to avoid expensive mold costs. Nonetheless, these signs do remain popular due to their traditional appearance.

Ceramic

Ceramic signs give a very traditional feel, though there is little scope for carving or sculpting, hence they can look a little flat. These signs tend to last very well once mounted.  Care must be taken not to crack the sign in the mounting process, or by dropping it prior to installation. Ceramic signs tend to be expensive, due to the complexity of the manufacturing process.

Acrylic

Plates, similar to those made of stainless steel or brass, can be used where a more modern look is desired. Acrylic signs are best suited for indoor/outdoor or business applications, but can also be used for house signs. Light and inexpensive.

Carved

Traditionally made of wood, carved signs allow for the most creativity in terms of painting, shape, and sculpture. Western red cedar and redwood (Sequoia sempervirens) is most common, although cherry and oak are also used along with a range of darker tropical woods. Wood requires regular maintenance and repeated coats of varnish or paint.  More recently developed synthetic materials, notably high-density urethane (HDU), have been extremely successful, allowing the same quality and craftsmanship coupled with a much greater weather resistance. Carved signs have been a traditional icon of the New England states in the USA, and are frequently also gilded with real gold. Traditional hand carving techniques are still used to create carved signs, although CNC routers are sometimes employed, and some sites exist which allow users to design their own sign prior to having it hand carved.

See also
 House number sign
 Paternoster Row (London)

References

Infographics